Joule heating, also known as resistive, resistance, or Ohmic heating, is the process by which the passage of an electric current through a conductor produces heat.

Joule's first law (also just Joule's law), also known in countries of former USSR as the Joule–Lenz law, states that the power of heating generated by an electrical conductor equals the product of its resistance and the square of the current:

Joule heating affects the whole electric conductor, unlike the Peltier effect which transfers heat from one electrical junction to another.

History
James Prescott Joule first published in December 1840, an abstract in the Proceedings of the Royal Society, suggesting that heat could be generated by an electrical current. Joule immersed a length of wire in a fixed mass of water and measured the temperature rise due to a known current flowing through the wire for a 30 minute period. By varying the current and the length of the wire he deduced that the heat produced was proportional to the square of the current multiplied by the electrical resistance of the immersed wire.

In 1841 and 1842, subsequent experiments showed that the amount of heat generated was proportional to the chemical energy used in the voltaic pile that generated the template. This led Joule to reject the caloric theory (at that time the dominant theory) in favor of the mechanical theory of heat (according to which heat is another form of energy).

Resistive heating was independently studied by Heinrich Lenz in 1842.

The SI unit of energy was subsequently named the joule and given the symbol J. The commonly known unit of power, the watt, is equivalent to one joule per second.

Microscopic description

Joule heating is caused by interactions between charge carriers (usually electrons) and the body of the conductor.

A potential difference (voltage) between two points of a conductor creates an electric field that accelerates charge carriers in the direction of the electric field, giving them kinetic energy. When the charged particles collide with the quasi-particles in the conductor (i.e. the canonically quantized, ionic lattice oscillations in the harmonic approximation of a crystal), energy is being transferred from the electrons to the lattice (by the creation of further lattice oscillations). The oscillations of the ions are the origin of the radiation ("thermal energy") that one measures in a typical experiment.

Power loss and noise
Joule heating is referred to as ohmic heating or resistive heating because of its relationship to Ohm's Law. It forms the basis for the large number of practical applications involving electric heating. However, in applications where heating is an unwanted by-product of current use (e.g., load losses in electrical transformers) the diversion of energy is often referred to as resistive loss. The use of high voltages in electric power transmission systems is specifically designed to reduce such losses in cabling by operating with commensurately lower currents. The ring circuits, or ring mains, used in UK homes are another example, where power is delivered to outlets at lower currents (per wire, by using two paths in parallel), thus reducing Joule heating in the wires. Joule heating does not occur in superconducting materials, as these materials have zero electrical resistance in the superconducting state.

Resistors create electrical noise, called Johnson–Nyquist noise. There is an intimate relationship between Johnson–Nyquist noise and Joule heating, explained by the fluctuation-dissipation theorem.

Formulas

Direct current
The most fundamental formula for Joule heating is the generalized power equation:

where
  is the power (energy per unit time) converted from electrical energy to thermal energy,
  is the current travelling through the resistor or other element,
  is the voltage drop across the element.

The explanation of this formula is:

Assuming the element behaves as a perfect resistor and that the power is completely converted into heat, the formula can be re-written by substituting Ohm's law, into the generalized power equation:

where R is the resistance.

Alternating current

When current varies, as it does in AC circuits,

where t is time and P is the instantaneous power being converted from electrical energy to heat. Far more often, the average power is of more interest than the instantaneous power:

where "avg" denotes average (mean) over one or more cycles, and "rms" denotes root mean square.

These formulas are valid for an ideal resistor, with zero reactance. If the reactance is nonzero, the formulas are modified:

where  is phase difference between current and voltage,  means real part, Z is the complex impedance, and Y* is the complex conjugate of the admittance (equal to 1/Z*).

For more details in the reactive case, see AC power∆0}

Differential form
Joule heating can also be calculated at a particular location in space. The differential form of the Joule heating equation gives the power per unit volume.

For a material with a conductivity ,  and therefore

where  is the resistivity.  This directly resembles the "" term of the macroscopic form.

The Joule heating then reads

where  denotes the complex conjugate.

High-voltage alternating current transmission of electricity

Overhead power lines transfer electrical energy from electricity producers to consumers. Those power lines have a nonzero resistance and therefore are subject to Joule heating, which causes transmission losses.

The split of power between transmission losses (Joule heating in transmission lines) and load (useful energy delivered to the consumer) can be approximated by a voltage divider. In order to minimize transmission losses, the resistance of the lines has to be as small as possible compared to the load (resistance of consumer appliances). Line resistance is minimized by the use of copper conductors, but the resistance and power supply specifications of consumer appliances are fixed.

Usually, a transformer is placed between the lines and consumption. When a high-voltage, low-intensity current in the primary circuit (before the transformer) is converted into a low-voltage, high-intensity current in the secondary circuit (after the transformer), the equivalent resistance of the secondary circuit becomes higher and transmission losses are reduced in proportion.

During the war of currents, AC installations could use transformers to reduce line losses by Joule heating, at the cost of higher voltage in the transmission lines, compared to DC installations.

Applications
Joule-heating or resistive-heating is used in multiple devices and industrial process. The part that converts electricity into heat is called a heating element.

Among the many practical uses are:

 An incandescent light bulb glows when the filament is heated by Joule heating, due to thermal radiation (also called blackbody radiation).
 Electric fuses are used as a safety, breaking the circuit by melting if enough current flows to melt them.
 Electronic cigarettes vaporize propylene glycol and vegetable glycerine by Joule heating.
 Multiple heating devices use Joule heating, such as electric stoves, electric heaters, soldering irons, cartridge heaters.
 Some food processing equipment may make use of Joule heating: running current through food material (which behave as an electrical resistor) causes heat release inside the food. The alternating electrical current coupled with the resistance of the food causes the generation of heat. A higher resistance increases the heat generated. Ohmic heating allows for fast and uniform heating of food products, which maintains quality. Products with particulates heat up faster (compared to conventional heat processing) due to higher resistance.

Food processing 
Joule heating is a flash pasteurization (also called "high-temperature short-time" (HTST)) aseptic process that runs an alternating current of 50–60 Hz through food. Heat is generated through the food's electrical resistance. As the product heats, electrical conductivity increases linearly. A higher electrical current frequency is best as it reduces oxidation and metallic contamination. This heating method is best for foods that contain particulates suspended in a weak salt-containing medium due to their high resistance properties.

Materials synthesis, recovery and processing
Flash joule heating (transient high-temperature electrothermal heating) has been used to synthesize allotropes of carbon, including graphene and diamond. Heating various solid carbon feedstocks (carbon black, coal, coffee grounds, etc.) to temperatures of ~3000 K for 10-150 milliseconds produces turbostratic graphene flakes. FJH has also been used to recover rare-earth elements used in modern electronics from industrial wastes. Beginning from a fluorinated carbon source, fluorinated activated carbon, fluorinated nanodiamond, concentric carbon (carbon shell around a nanodiamond core), and fluorinated flash graphene can be synthesized.

Heating efficiency 

Heat is not to be confused with internal energy or synonymously thermal energy. While intimately connected to heat, they are distinct physical quantities. 

As a heating technology, Joule heating has a coefficient of performance of 1.0, meaning that every joule of electrical energy supplied produces one joule of heat. In contrast, a heat pump can have a coefficient of more than 1.0 since it moves additional thermal energy from the environment to the heated item.

The definition of the efficiency of a heating process requires defining the boundaries of the system to be considered. When heating a building, the overall efficiency is different when considering heating effect per unit of electric energy delivered on the customer's side of the meter, compared to the overall efficiency when also considering the losses in the power plant and transmission of power.

Hydraulic equivalent

In the energy balance of groundwater flow a hydraulic equivalent of Joule's law is used:

where:
  = loss of hydraulic energy due to friction of flow in -direction per unit of time (m/day) – comparable to 
  = flow velocity in -direction (m/day) – comparable to 
  = hydraulic conductivity of the soil (m/day) – the hydraulic conductivity is inversely proportional to the hydraulic resistance which compares to

See also
 Resistance wire
 Heating element
 Nichrome
 Tungsten
 Molybdenum disilicide
 Overheating (electricity)
 Thermal management (electronics)
 Induction heating
 Dielectric heating

References

Electric heating
Electricity
Thermodynamics
James Prescott Joule